"A Song in the Night" is a country music song written by Bobby Lee Springfield, recorded by Johnny Duncan.  It was the first of two singles from his 1977 LP, Come a Little Bit Closer.  Harmony vocals during the last minute of the song were provided by Janie Fricke. 

Initially promoted as "his best record yet," the song went to No. 5 on both Billboard American and Canadian Hot Country Singles charts. It became his fourth of a string of seven Top Five hits.

Duncan's only song to cross over to the Pop charts, "A Song in the Night" also reached #105 in the U.S.

Charts

Weekly charts

Year-end charts

References

External links
 Lyrics of this song
 

1977 songs
1977 singles
Johnny Duncan (country singer) songs
Song recordings produced by Billy Sherrill
Columbia Records singles
Songs about nights
Songs about music